The Shell Oil Company "Spectacular" Sign is a historic advertising sign by the Shell Oil Company (the US-based subsidiary of Royal Dutch Shell placed at 187 Magazine Street in Cambridge, Massachusetts, United States).

History 
The Shell Oil Company sign was built in a Moderne style in 1933 by Donnelly Electric Manufacturing Company, and was originally located on the Shell Company building in Boston on Commonwealth Avenue, which now houses Boston University Academy. 

It was moved to its present site adjacent to Memorial Drive in 1944. It is, along with the Citgo sign in Boston, one of only two surviving advertising signs of its type in the area. Although the regular station signage is updated to reflect the company's current logo, the "Spectacular" sign itself also remains in the same location where it has always been.

The sign was added to the National Register of Historic Places in 1994.

See also
 National Register of Historic Places listings in Cambridge, Massachusetts
 Commonwealth Avenue (Boston)

References

Commercial buildings on the National Register of Historic Places in Massachusetts
Individual signs in the United States
Shell plc buildings and structures
Buildings and structures in Cambridge, Massachusetts
National Register of Historic Places in Cambridge, Massachusetts
Individual signs on the National Register of Historic Places

Buildings and structures completed in 1933
1933 establishments in Massachusetts